Abraxas sordida is a moth of the family Geometridae.

References

Abraxini
Moths of Asia
Moths described in 1893